Queens Building may refer to:

Queens Building, Heathrow, England
Queens Building, Townsville, Queensland
Queen's Building, Central, Hong Kong
Queen's Building, Wolverhampton, England
Queen's Building, University of Bristol, Bristol, England